Rachel Oestreicher Bernheim (born May 15, 1943) is the chairwoman of The Raoul Wallenberg Committee of the United States, a human rights organization in New York.

Biography
She was born on May 15, 1943 as Rachel Oestreicher to Irvin Oestreicher of Salisbury, North Carolina. Her father owned Dave Oestreicher Inc., a department store in Salisbury. She graduated from Sarah Lawrence College. Her first marriage ended in divorce. She then married Charles Alexander Bernheim, a managing director of Bear, Stearns & Company.

References 

Jewish activists
1943 births
American human rights activists
Women human rights activists
Raoul Wallenberg
People from Salisbury, North Carolina
Living people